Ellen Ndeshi Namhila (born 1964) is the vice rector of the University of Namibia. She is on a five-year leave of absence from her job as the head of the university’s library.

Life and career 
In 1976, at the age of 12, Namhila endured an attack by the South African Defence Force in her home area. She was injured, as bullets went through her arms and legs. She was rescued to her home village, and later she fled to Angola and worked as a nurse in a SWAPO guerrilla camp. 

She went to high school in Gambia, and pursued further studies in Finland, at the University of Tampere, where she studied information science. She graduated in 1993, and the title of her M.A. thesis was Rural development communication in Namibia: an Owambo case study. Later, in 2015, she defended her doctoral thesis in Tampere. The title of her thesis was Recordkeeping and missing "Native estate" records in Namibia: an investigation of colonial gaps in a post-colonial national archive.

As the vice rector of UNAM, she is responsible e.g. for human resources, economy and information technology and the buildings of the university.

Books published 
In 1997 she published a book tittled "The Price of Freedom" It's a story of an escape from a violence which ruptured a child's sense that adults provide security, of an education obtained in The Gambia and Finland, of how friends and leaders in the camps replaced her extended family. The price of freedom is Ellen's biography of her journey as a refugee and a returner to her newly independent country. This book has been used in the University of Namibia for the English Access for years. In 2005 she again published a book titled "Kaxumba KaNdola" which is a biography of Namibian political activist and founding member of SWAPO. and in 2009 she puplishes "Tears of Courage: Five Mothers Five Stories One Victory "

References

Academic staff of the University of Namibia
1964 births
Living people
Namibian librarians
Women librarians
University of Tampere alumni